Jeffrey John (Jeff) Meckstroth (born May 15, 1956)  is an American professional contract bridge player. He is a multiple world champion, winning the Bermuda Bowl on USA teams five times. He is one of only ten players who have won the so-called triple crown of bridge: the Bermuda Bowl, the World Open Pairs and the World Team Olympiad. As of May 16, 2016, he was the fifth-ranking World Grand Master. For decades Meckstroth has been in a regular partnership with Eric Rodwell and together, nicknamed "Meckwell", they are one of the most successful bridge partnerships of all time. They are well known for playing an aggressive and very detailed system that derived from Precision Club.

One of Meckstroth's iconic achievements was winning three of the four available major events contested at the ACBL's 2008 fall championships, the Open Board-A-Match Teams, Blue Ribbon Pairs, and Reisinger Teams.

He became ACBL's all-time leading masterpoint holder when he went past Paul Soloway's long held record during the Indianapolis Winter Regional in March 2010.

Meckstroth was born in Springfield, Ohio. He is a full-time bridge professional and lives in Clearwater Beach, Florida with his wife, Sally Chapleau-Meckstroth.

Bridge accomplishments

Awards
 ACBL Player of the Decade (3)1990s, 2000s, 2010s
 ACBL Player of the Year (3) 1992, 2004, 2009
 Barry Crane Top 500 1993, 1995, 2000, 2001, 2002, 2006, 2007, 2008
 Mott-Smith Trophy 1979, 1980, 1985, 2000, 2009, 2017
 Fishbein Trophy 1996, 2004, 2007
 Herman Trophy 1980, 1982, 1995, 2004
 ACBL King of Bridge 1974
 Le Bridgeur Award (Best Played Hand of the Year) 1998
 IBPA Award (Best Played Hand of the Year) 1999
 Goren Trophy (1) 2009

Wins
 Bermuda Bowl (5) 1981, 1995, 2000, 2003, 2009 
 World Open Team Olympiad (1) 1988
 World Open Pairs (1) 1986
 World Mixed Pairs (1) 2002
 North American Bridge Championships (61)
 Senior Knockout Teams (2) 2013, 2014, 2016 
 Grand National Teams (14) 1990, 1997, 1999, 2000, 2002, 2004, 2007, 2008, 2011, 2012, 2013, 2014, 2015, 2018 
 Jacoby Open Swiss Teams (6) 1989, 1994, 2002, 2006, 2008, 2009 
 Blue Ribbon Pairs (3) 1982, 2008, 2016 
 Mitchell Board-a-Match Teams (2) 1984, 2008 
 Nail Life Master Open Pairs (1) 1979 
 Reisinger (9) 1979, 1985, 1993, 1994, 1995, 2004, 2005, 2008, 2009 
 Rockwell Mixed Pairs (1) 1980 
 Silodor Open Pairs (3) 1979, 1992, 2016 
 Spingold (12) 1984, 1988, 1991, 1993, 1994, 1995, 1996, 1998, 1999, 2004, 2006, 2007 
 Vanderbilt (7) 1980, 1982, 1985, 2000, 2003, 2014, 2017 
 Wernher Open Pairs (1) 1999 
 United States Bridge Championships (13)
 Open Team Trials (13) 1980, 1988, 1991, 1992, 1998, 2001, 2002, 2004, 2007, 2008, 2012, 2014, 2017
 European Open Bridge Championships (1)
 Open Pairs (1) 2003
 Other notable wins:
 Buffett Cup (1) 2010
 Cavendish Invitational Teams (2) 2000, 2003
 Cavendish Invitational Pairs (1) 2019
 Macallan Invitational Pairs (2) 1995, 1996

Runners-up
 Bermuda Bowl (2) 1997, 2005
 World Open Team Olympiad (1) 1992
 Rosenblum Cup (1) 2010
 North American Bridge Championships (26)
 Senior Knockout Teams (1) 2012 
 Grand National Teams (3) 1994, 2003, 2005 
 Jacoby Open Swiss Teams (2) 2005, 2010 
 Mitchell Board-a-Match Teams (2) 1998, 1999 
 Chicago Mixed Board-a-Match (2) 1983, 1992 
 Nail Life Master Open Pairs (2) 1985, 1992 
 Norman Kay Platinum Pairs (1) 2013 
 Reisinger (1) 1980 
 Spingold (4) 1985, 1990, 2011, 2012 
 Vanderbilt (6) 1979, 1991, 1996, 2002, 2018, 2019 
 Keohane North American Swiss Teams (1) 2022
 von Zedtwitz Life Master Pairs (1) 1983 
 United States Bridge Championships (4)
 Open Team Trials (4) 1982, 1984, 1985, 1997
 Other notable 2nd places:
 Cavendish Invitational Teams (1) 1997
 Cap Volmac World Top Invitational Pairs (1) 1994
 Sunday Times–Macallan Invitational Pairs (1) 1993
 Cavendish Invitational Pairs (1) 1984

Publications

 "New Minor Forcing & Fourth Suit Forcing & Artificial" (Louisville: Devyn Press, 1985), Championship Bridge no. 28  – pamphlet
 Win the Bermuda Bowl With Me, Meckstroth and Marc Smith (Toronto: Master Point Press, 2001), 188 pp.

References

External links
 
 
 Nickell Team at the United States Bridge Federation (2009?) – with player profiles
 Audio-video interview uploaded October 27, 2009, by ACBLvideo at YouTube

 

1956 births
Living people
American contract bridge players
Bermuda Bowl players
Contract bridge writers